Golden Chameleon (Italian: Colpo doppio del camaleonte d'oro) is a 1967 Italian comedy crime film directed by Giorgio Stegani and starring Mark Damon, Luisa Baratto and Magda Konopka.

Cast
 Mark Damon as Vittorio 
 Luisa Baratto as Micaela 
 Magda Konopka as Ginevra 
 Luciano Pigozzi as Aragosta 
 Daniele Vargas as Direttore della banca 
 Poldo Bendandi as Ora Pro Nobis 
 Umberto D'Orsi as Il Dottore 
 Ugo Fangareggi as Einstein 
 Giampiero Littera as Cassaforte 
 Mino Doro as Guglielmo 
 Giulio Farnese
 Giovanni Cianfriglia as Sgherro di Guglielmo 
 Stefano Ceccarelli as Buttafuori 
 Stefano Pescarelli
 Giulio Battiferri as Giuseppe 
 Valentino Macchi as Impiegato di banca

References

Bibliography 
 Enrico Lancia & Fabio Melelli. Le straniere del nostro cinema. Gremese Editore, 2005.

External links 
 

1967 films
Italian crime comedy films
1960s crime comedy films
Poliziotteschi films
1960s Italian-language films
Films directed by Giorgio Stegani
1967 comedy films
1960s Italian films